John Abbott (1874 – 1947) was a fisherman and political figure in Newfoundland. He represented Bonavista Bay in the Newfoundland House of Assembly from 1913 to 1923.

He was born in Bonavista and educated at the Methodist School there. After completing his education, Abbott became a fisherman like his father. In 1909, he joined the Fishermen's Protective Union. In 1913, he became manager of the Union Trading Company store in Bonavista. Abbott retired from politics in 1923 and was named a customs collector. In 1930, he became a justice of the peace. He was widowed after his first marriage, and later remarried. He had children with both wives. Abbott died of stomach cancer in 1947, and left behind a large family. Descendants of Abbott still live in Newfoundland, and his daughter Mona Abbott Kesting has chronicled much of his work.

References 
 

Fishermen's Protective Union MHAs
1874 births
People from Bonavista, Newfoundland and Labrador
1947 deaths
Dominion of Newfoundland politicians